Metal Storm was an Australian small arms weapon system.

Metal Storm or Metalstorm can also refer to:

 Metal Storm (webzine), a popular metal music website
 Metal fırtına, a Turkish novel whose title translates to "Metal Storm"
 Metal Storm (video game), a 1991 video game by Irem
 Metalstorm: The Destruction of Jared-Syn, a 1983 science fiction movie
 "Metal Storm / Face the Slayer", a song from the 1983 album Show No Mercy by Slayer